Still Not Quite Human is a 1992 television film written and directed by Eric Luke and starring Jay Underwood and Alan Thicke. It is the third and final film in a series based on the Not Quite Human novels by Seth McEvoy. The story, which has a darker tone than the previous films, features the human-looking android, Chip, embarking on a mission to rescue his father, who has been kidnapped by a ruthless tycoon in order to acquire his knowledge of android technology. Robyn Lively does not return to reprise her role as Becky, but she is mentioned to have taken a job in another state.

Plot
Dr. Jonas Carson (Alan Thicke) goes to a robotics convention with Chip and an inferior model to test whether or not the world is ready for the idea of living with androids as he does with Chip. When his other android fails, Jonas becomes the subject of ridicule and is ready to reveal Chip's status in order to save face, but stops himself, choosing to accept the loss of credibility over the loss of the trust Chip has placed in him. However, Jonas is kidnapped by hired goons of Dr. Frederick Berrigon (Christopher Neame), and replaced by a look-alike android. His android son, Chip (Jay Underwood), notices the swap and manages to reprogram the impostor into an ally. Since he is like an additional Jonas, Chip names him Bonus (Alan Thicke in a dual role).

Chip enlists the aid of a small-time pickpocket, Kyle (Adam Philipson), whom he has just befriended, to help him rescue his father. Bonus is able to lead them to the mansion where Dr. Carson is being held, but tight security prevents them from sneaking in successfully. Chip meets up with Kate Morgan (Rosa Nevin), who is a policewoman. Officer Morgan has been after Kyle's pickpocketing and illicit watch sales for some time, but agrees to not press charges if he helps Chip rescue Jonas. She devises a plan to assume the personas of wealthy investors in order to gain willful entry to Dr. Berrigon's estate, seeking guidance from her rich Aunt Mildred (Betsy Palmer) to prepare them.

Their ploy gets them inside, but they are soon found snooping, so Kyle and Bonus keep the guards occupied while Chip finds his father. Just before he breaks into the room where his father is being held, Chip learns that Berrigon was trying to extract Dr. Carson's knowledge to aid in building a war machine android. A moment later, Chip is confronted by a working prototype and is forced to fight it, with Berrigon watching from a distance. Chip has to avoid its laserfire, initially, but he manages to smash the laser with a projectile. The battle becomes a contest of speed and raw strength, with Chip being knocked to the ground and nearly struck in the chest with the end of a metal rod. Chip scrambles up, sets a compressed hydrogen canister on a cart and smashes the valve off, causing it to speed toward the other android and smash it against a group of canisters, which explode.

Berrigon, having witnessed Chip's victory, realizes that he must be Dr. Carson's android, but Chip flings him into a mud pond. When several policemen follow Kate to make the arrest, a disheveled and frantic Berrigon yells for them to arrest Chip on account of him being a strong android; unconvinced, they haul him away. A reformed Kyle hugs Chip goodbye; feeling a power panel on Chip's back, Kyle shrugs it off as imagination. Aunt Mildred congratulates her niece on arresting Berrigon, then becomes attracted to Bonus, starting a relationship with him.

Cast
 Jay Underwood as Chip Carson
 Alan Thicke as Dr. Jonas Carson / Bonus
 Adam Philipson as Kyle Roberts
 Rosa Nevin as Officer Kate Morgan
 Christopher Neame as Dr. Frederick Berrigon
 Ken Pogue as Bundy, Berrigon's Butler
 Sheelah Megill as Miss Prism
 Betsy Palmer as Aunt Mildred

References

External links
 

1992 comedy films
1992 science fiction films
American teen comedy films
Films scored by John Debney
Android (robot) films
1992 television films
1992 films
Television sequel films
American science fiction television films
Disney Channel original films
1990s English-language films
1990s American films